Sreethu Krishnan (born 2 May 1999) is an Indian actress who works in the Tamil and Malayalam television industries. She made her debut in 7C TV series on Vijay TV. She is known for playing the characters Indira in the TV series Aayutha Ezhuthu and Aleena Peter in Ammayariyathe.

Early life
Krishnan was born in Ernakulam, Kerala, and completed her schooling at St. Francis Xavier Anglo-Indian Higher Secondary School, Chennai. She has a degree of BA Economics from Ethiraj College for Women, Chennai. She was doing her PG of MA Economics (distance education).

Television

Filmography

References

1999 births
Indian film actresses
Indian television actresses
Living people